Shane Varley is a New Zealand rugby league player who represented New Zealand.

Playing career
Varley played for Richmond and the Point Chevalier Pirates in the Auckland Rugby League competition and  represented Auckland.

He was first selected to play for New Zealand in 1978, touring Australia and Papua New Guinea. He went on to play in 11 test matches for New Zealand and was part of the 1980 tour of Great Britain and France. In 1981 he captained Auckland to a 20-10 victory over France.

He played in England for two off-seasons, playing for Workington Town in 1981-82 and Leigh (Heritage № 920) in 1983-84.

Varley's last test match for New Zealand was in 1984. Also that year he represented Oceania in a match against Europe, held to celebrate French Rugby League's 50th anniversary.

References

Living people
Auckland rugby league team players
Leigh Leopards players
New Zealand national rugby league team players
New Zealand rugby league players
Point Chevalier Pirates players
Richmond Bulldogs players
Rugby league halfbacks
Workington Town players
Year of birth missing (living people)